Ombra della sera (Italian for "Shadow of the evening") is an Etruscan statue from the town of Velathri, later Volterra. It was first depicted in a 1737 collection of Etruscan antiquities. Similarities to the work of modern artist Alberto Giacometti have been frequently observed.

Features
The statue represents a nude male, 57.5 cm long (about 22.6 inches), with very elongated body but head in normal proportions. It is estimated by archaeologists to date from the third century BC.

References

Etruscan sculptures
Volterra